Stosicia houbricki is a species of minute sea snail, a marine gastropod mollusk or micromollusk in the family Zebinidae.

Distribution
This species occurs in the Caribbean Sea off Belize.

Description 
The maximum recorded shell length is 4.3 mm.

Habitat 
Minimum recorded depth is 0 m. Maximum recorded depth is 35 m.

References

 Sleurs W.J.M. (1996) A revision of the Recent species of the genus Stosicia (Gastropoda: Rissoidae). Mededelingen van de Koninklijke Academie voor Weteschappen, Letteren en Schone Kunsten van België, Klasse der Wetenschappen 58(1): 117-158, 19 pls. page(s): 142
 Rosenberg, G., F. Moretzsohn, and E. F. García. 2009. Gastropoda (Mollusca) of the Gulf of Mexico, Pp. 579–699 in Felder, D.L. and D.K. Camp (eds.), Gulf of Mexico–Origins, Waters, and Biota. Biodiversity. Texas A&M Press, College Station, Texas.

External links
 

houbricki
Gastropods described in 1996